The City is a Canadian television drama series, created by Pierre Sarrazin and Suzette Couture, which aired on CTV from 1999 to 2000.

Set in Toronto, the series starred Torri Higginson as Katharine Strachan Berg, a society wife who gave up her career in law after marrying wealthy real estate developer Jack Berg (John Ralston). When her son Strachan (Matthew Lemche) is injured in a shooting in the debut episode, she becomes motivated to return to public life by running for a seat on Toronto City Council, thus drawing her into contact with a diverse ensemble of characters representing many different aspects of the big city beyond the confines of her privileged and affluent Rosedale life. In the show's second season, she has been elected to a council seat, and must navigate the internal workings of Toronto City Hall to advocate for change while also dealing with the breakdown of her marriage.

The series was essentially a prime time soap opera, although Sarrazin rejected that label because of its association with unrealistic and melodramatic plots, and instead compared the show's intentions to socially realistic antecedents such as The Bonfire of the Vanities, Upstairs, Downstairs and the novels of Victor Hugo.

The shooting of Strachan in the pilot was based on the real Just Desserts shooting of 1994.

The series premiered in March 1999 with a 13-episode first season, and then returned in November 1999 with a 20-episode second season. It was not renewed for a third season.

Awards
The show received three Gemini Award nominations at the 14th Gemini Awards in 1999, for Best Supporting Actor in a Drama Series (Shawn Doyle, Michael Sarrazin) and Best Guest Actor in a Drama Series (Jan Rubeš). It won three awards at the 15th Gemini Awards in 2000, for Best Actress in a Drama Series (Higginson), Best Supporting Actress in a Drama Series (Shannon Lawson) and Best Guest Actor in a Drama Series (Geordie Johnson); it was also nominated, but did not win, for Best Guest Actress in a Drama Series (Sheila McCarthy) and Best Direction in a Drama Series (Jerry Ciccoritti).

Cast
Torri Higginson as Katharine Strachan Berg, a Rosedale lawyer
John Ralston as Jack Berg
Shannon Lawson as Marly Lamarr
Jody Racicot as St. Crispin St. James
Matthew Lemche as Strachan Berg
Michael Sarrazin as Milt
Aidan Devine as Father Shane Devlin
Robin Brûlé as Angie Hart
Shawn Doyle as Det. McKeigan
James Gallanders as Det. Croft
Arnold Pinnock as Tyrone Meeks
Noam Jenkins as Lance
Lorne Cardinal as Gabriel
Enuka Okuma as Kira

Mel Lastman, the real-life Mayor of Toronto at the time the series aired, made a cameo appearance in the second season as himself, and Toronto radio host "Humble" Howard Glassman was heard in numerous episodes as a radio personality voicing public commentary on events.

Episodes

Season one

Season two

References

External links

 

CTV Television Network original programming
Canadian television soap operas
1990s Canadian drama television series
2000s Canadian drama television series
1999 Canadian television series debuts
2000 Canadian television series endings
Television shows set in Toronto
Canadian political drama television series